Romandola-Madonna del Ponte (suddenly known simply as Romandola) is a hamlet (frazione) of the comune of Campagna in the Province of Salerno, Campania, Italy.

History

Geography
The village is situated in a hill zone in the central-eastern side of its municipality, close to the hamlets of Puglietta and Serradarce.

See also
Campagna
Camaldoli
Puglietta
Quadrivio
Santa Maria La Nova
Serradarce

Frazioni of the Province of Salerno
Localities of Cilento